= History's Greatest Machines with Dolph Lundgren =

TV documentary series

- Genre: Documentary
- Original language: English
- No. of seasons: 1
- No. of episodes: 8

Production
- Running time: 41 minutes

Original release
- Network: History Channel
- Release: June 1, 2026 – present

History's Greatest Machines with Dolph Lundgren is a documentary TV series that explores the impact of some of most important machines from the Model T to the personal computer.

== Episodes ==
No.	Title	Original release date
1	"Aerial Attackers"	June 1, 2026
2	"Mission Critical"	June 8, 2026
3	"Monster Machines"	June 15, 2026
4	"Devices of Deception"	June 22, 2026
5	"Breakthrough Boats"	June 29, 2026
6	TBA	July 6, 2026
7	TBA	July 13, 2026
8	TBA	July 20, 2026
